Fomena is a small town and is the capital of Adansi North, a district in the Ashanti Region of Ghana. The town is known as the place where the bond of 1844 was signed.

It specified a relationship between the British and the local chiefs, who were the main parties in the treaty. The British viewed the agreement as an understanding to take part in the administration of justice and the enforcement of their laws in the local states, but the local leaders saw the agreement as a military and defense contract only.

The town is also known for the T.I. Ahmadiyya Senior High School.  The school is a second cycle institution. There is also a Nursing Training institution there called Community Health Nurses Training College, Fomena.

History 
In 1820, Joseph Dupuis recorded Fomena as village of humble size. Throughout the 19th century, it underwent major growth under the Ashanti Empire. By 1875, Fomena served as the capital of one of the constituent territories of the Ashanti metropolitan area.

References

Populated places in the Ashanti Region